The Carlos Palanca Memorial Awards for Literature winners in the year 1991 (rank, title of winning entry, name of author).


English division
Short story
First prize: “Portents” by Jessica Zafra
Second prize: “The Music Child” by Alfred A. Yuson
Third prize: “All Possible Pasts and Future” by Ma. Luisa A. Igloria

Short story for children
First prize: “The Blanket” by Ma. Elena Paterno-Locsin
Second prize: “The Jink, the Dolphin, and the Deep Sea Mystery” by Edgardo B. Maranan; and “Francisco” by Ma. Elena Paterno-Locsin
Third prize: “Blue, Red, Yello” by Ramon Sunico; “The Fifth Element” by Edgardo B. Maranan; and “Tito Jose's Legacy” by Ametta Suarez-Taguchi

Poetry
First prize: “Dogodog and Other Poems Bypassed by the Northerlies” by Arnold Molina Azurin
Second prize: “Poems of a Season” by Merlie Alunan
Third prize: “From the Hothouse” by Ma. Fatima V. Lim; and “Living in the Movies” by Franklin Cimatu

Essay
First prize: “Unravelling the Knots of Ethnicity” by Arnold Molina Azurin
Second prize: “Killing Time in Little Earth” by Jose Y. Dalisay Jr.
Third prize: “Intimations of Mortality” by Anthony L. Tan

One-act play
First prize: No winner
Second prize: “A Footnote to History” by Jessie B. Garcia; “Short Time” by Dean Francis Alfar; and “The Nuptial Initiation” by Felix A. Clemente
Third prize: No winner

Full-length play
First prize: No winner
Second prize: No winner
Third prize: No winner

Filipino division
Short story
Special Mention:
“Ang Pinagdaanang Buhay ni Nano” by Lav Indico Diaz 
“Isang Hindi Malilimutang Tanghali sa Buhay ng mga Ginoo at Ginang ng Bitukang Manok” by Fernando Villarca Cao 
“Marino” by Reynaldo A. Duque
“Si Ato sa Sangmagdamagang Pagtatakas sa Kawalang Malay” by Pat V. Villafuerte 
“Tatlong Bakas ng Paa” by Lorenzo Tabin

Short story for children
First prize: “Ang Pintor ni Garu” by Natasha Vizcarra
Second prize: “Ang Ambahan ni Ambo” by Edgardo B. Maranan
Third prize: “Salidum-Ay” by Reynaldo A. Duque

Poetry
First prize: “Desparacido/Desaparadico” by Franklin Cimatu
Second prize: “Hari ang Ari” by JJ Alvarez Dela Rosa; and “Mga Tula sa Pagpapalit ng Tadhana” by Roberto Ofanda Umil
Third prize: No winner
Special Mention: “Putol” by Michael M. Coroza

Essay
First prize: “Ang Pagdadalaga ng mga Batang Taludtod” by Glecy C. Atienza
Second prize: “Ang Mito ng Pagkalalaki ni Richard Gomez” by Roland Tolentino
Third prize: “Talaarawan ng Isang Galang Peryodista” by  Omer Oscar Almenario

One-act play
First prize: No winner
Second prize: “Sa Pusod ng Yungib” by Ramon C. Jocson
Third prize: “Open 25-hours a Day” by Reuel Molina Aguila
Honorable mention: “Eksodo” by Rodolfo R. Lana Jr.; and “Hindi Tungkol sa Mga Bayani” by Jose Bernard Capino

Full-length play
First prize: “Baclaran” by Wilfred S. Victoria
Second prize: “Kung Paano Balatan ang Talop na Bunga” by Manuel R. Buising
Third prize: “Poon” by Carlos Dela Paz Jr.

Teleplay
First Honorable mention: “Kapanahon” by Ronald S. Marcelo; and "Loida: Taxi Driver" by Segundo D. Matias Jr.
Second Honorable mention: “Ang Halamanan sa Paso” by Diosdado Anzures Jr.; and “Isang Bukas Para Kay Junjun” by Melchor Salandanan Ventura
Third Honorable mention: “Jayvee's Brother” by Rolando S. Salvana

References
 

Palanca Awards
Palanca Awards, 1991